Zinc finger RANBP2-type containing 1 is a protein that in humans is encoded by the ZRANB1 gene.

References

Further reading